Coming Up for Air is a 2009 album by Davy Knowles.  It is the follow-up to Back Door Slam's debut album Roll Away.  The effort was co-produced by Peter Frampton and Bob Clearmountain. Davy Knowles plays electric and acoustic guitars, mandolin, sings lead and contributes backing vocals. The studio band are Kevin McCormick on bass, Mauricio Fritz Lewak on drums, (both from Jackson Browne's band), Benmont Tench on keyboards and Peter Frampton on guitar, bass and backing vocal duties. Frampton also co-wrote two songs on the album with Knowles.

The distinctive turtle artwork was designed by Manx graphic artist Kit Nelson.
Back cover photograph by Todd Bradley, 13 O'Clock Photography.

Track listing

External links
 Amazon.com listing of "Coming Up for Air"

2009 albums
Albums produced by Bob Clearmountain
Albums produced by Peter Frampton